KNLF (95.9 FM) is a radio station broadcasting a Contemporary Christian format. Licensed to Quincy and serving the surrounding Sierra Nevada area.  It is in Plumas County, Northern California.

The station is currently owned by New Life Broadcasting. The stations airs AFR on Monday-Friday at 12:30pm-2pm, 3pm-5pm, and 5:30pm.

External links

Contemporary Christian radio stations in the United States
Plumas County, California
American Family Radio stations
NLF